was a Japanese tennis player. In 1955 he and Kosei Kamo became the first Japanese players to win a Grand Slam tournament.

Career
In 1955 Miyagi won the U.S. National Championships men's doubles title at the Longwood Cricket Club in Boston with compatriot Kosei Kamo after a five-set victory over Americans Gerald Moss and Bill Quillian.  Hurricane Diane roared through New England in August 1955, flooding the tennis courts and delaying the tournament for a week. When the tournament resumed many of the leading players such as Ken Rosewall, Tony Trabert, Lew Hoad, and Vic Seixas had already left which reduced the quality of the competitors remaining in the men's doubles draw.

Miyagi won the Japanese tennis championships in 1954, 1955, 1957, and 1960.

Between 1952 and 1963 he played 16 times for the Japanese Davis Cup team.

At the 1962 Asian Games in Jakarta, Indonesia he won a gold medal in the men's doubles competition with Michio Fujii and a silver medal in the men's singles competition.

Grand Slam finals

Doubles (1 title)

References

External links
 
 
 

1931 births
2021 deaths
Japanese male tennis players
Sportspeople from Tokyo
Asian Games medalists in tennis
Asian Games gold medalists for Japan
Asian Games silver medalists for Japan
Medalists at the 1962 Asian Games
Tennis players at the 1962 Asian Games
Grand Slam (tennis) champions in men's doubles
United States National champions (tennis)
20th-century Japanese people